Ally Scott (born 26 August 1950, in Glasgow) is a Scottish former professional football player who is best known for his time with Rangers and Hibernian.

Scott began his career at Queen's Park before being signed by Rangers in 1973. He left Rangers three seasons later to join Hibernian. Afterwards, Scott had spells with Morton, Partick Thistle, Queen of the South, East Stirlingshire.

External links

1950 births
Living people
Footballers from Glasgow
Rangers F.C. players
Queen's Park F.C. players
Hibernian F.C. players
Partick Thistle F.C. players
Greenock Morton F.C. players
Queen of the South F.C. players
East Stirlingshire F.C. players
Association football forwards
Scottish footballers
Scottish Football League players
Scotland amateur international footballers